Daloa is a city in western Ivory Coast. It is the seat of both the Sassandra-Marahoué District and the Haut-Sassandra Region. It is also the seat of and a sub-prefecture of Daloa Department. Daloa is also a commune. In the 2014 census, the city had a population of 245,360, making it the third-largest city in the country. It lies to the west of Yamoussoukro, the capital of Ivory Coast. Daloa is an important trading centre, particularly for cocoa. The city is served by Daloa Airport and is home to the Roman Catholic Diocese of Daloa, with its cathedral at Cathédrale du Christ-Roi.

History

Civil War

The town was repeatedly contested during the First Ivorian Civil War, which lasted from 2002 to 2004. Following the takeover of the town by the government on 16 October 2002, fifty civilians from the north were allegedly killed by government troops. Amnesty International described the killings as a "massacre", saying people in military uniform had killed people suspected of supporting the rebel Patriotic Movement of Côte d'Ivoire. The killings were allegedly based on their Muslim names or that the victims were nationals of Mali, Burkino Faso or Guinea. Côte d'Ivoire authorities ordered an inquiry but stated government forces had not been responsible. However, no charges were brought and the Ouagadougou Peace Agreement in March 2007 between President Laurent Gbagbo and rebel leader Guillaume Soro incorporated a general amnesty for crimes committed in this time, except for crimes against humanity, war crimes and economic crimes.

In February 2012, the International Criminal Court decided to investigate this incident.

Language
The Bété language, a Niger-Congo language belonging to the Kru branch, is spoken in Daloa.

Villages
The thirty four villages of the sub-prefecture of Daloa and their population in 2014 are:

Fauna
At least 30 amphibian species are found in Daloa and its surroundings. The following frog species have been recorded in Daloa.

Arthroleptidae
Arthroleptis spp. (Arthroleptis poecilonotus complex)
Leptopelis spiritusnoctis
Leptopelis viridis (very common near human settlements)
Bufonidae
Amietophrynus maculatus
Amietophrynus regularis (very common near human settlements)
DicroglossidaeHoplobatrachus occipitalis (commonly sold in markets for human consumption)
HemisotidaeHemisus marmoratusHyperoliidaeAfrixalus dorsalisHyperolius concolor concolor (very common near human settlements)Hyperolius fusciventris fusciventrisHyperolius guttulatusHyperolius nitidulusHyperolius picturatusHyperolius sp.Kassina schioetziKassina senegalensisMicrohylidaePhrynomantis micropsPhrynobatrachidaePhrynobatrachus calcaratusPhrynobatrachus francisciPhrynobatrachus gutturosusPhrynobatrachus latifronsPipidaeXenopus muelleriPtychadenidaePtychadena bibroniPtychadena mascareniensisPtychadena oxyrhynchusPtychadena tournieriPtychadena pumilioPtychadena telliniiRanidaeAmnirana albolabrisAmnirana galamensis''

People
People from Daloa include:
the musician Ernesto Djédjé
the academic, politician and short-story writer, Séry Bailly
the historian and diplomat Pierre Kipré
the Celtic footballer Vakoun Issouf Bayo

Twin towns
Daloa is twinned with:
 Pau, France, since 1984
 Campinas, Brazil, since 1982

References

 
Sub-prefectures of Haut-Sassandra
District capitals of Ivory Coast
Communes of Haut-Sassandra
Regional capitals of Ivory Coast